The species Bundibugyo ebolavirus is the taxonomic home of one virus, Bundibugyo virus (BDBV), that forms filamentous virions and is closely related to the infamous Ebola virus (EBOV). The virus causes severe disease in humans in the form of viral hemorrhagic fever and is a Select agent, World Health Organization Risk Group 4 Pathogen (requiring Biosafety Level 4-equivalent containment), National Institutes of Health/National Institute of Allergy and Infectious Diseases Category A Priority Pathogen, Centers for Disease Control and Prevention Category A Bioterrorism Agent, and is listed as a Biological Agent for Export Control by the Australia Group.

Use of term 
The species Bundibugyo ebolavirus is a virological taxon (i.e. a man-made concept) that was suggested in 2008 to be included in the genus Ebolavirus, family Filoviridae, order Mononegavirales. The species has a single virus member, Bundibugyo virus (BDBV). The members of the species are called Bundibugyo ebolaviruses. The name Bundibugyo ebolavirus is derived from Bundibugyo (the name of the chief town of the Ugandan Bundibugyo District, where Bundibugyo virus was first discovered)  and the taxonomic suffix ebolavirus (which denotes an ebolavirus species).

Bundibugyo virus (abbreviated BDBV) was first described in 2008 as a single member of a suggested new species Bundibugyo ebolavirus, which was suggested to be included into the genus Ebolavirus, family Filoviridae, order Mononegavirales.

According to the rules for taxon naming established by the International Committee on Taxonomy of Viruses (ICTV), the name Bundibugyo ebolavirus is always to be capitalized, italicized, never abbreviated, and to be preceded by the word "species". The names of its members (Bundibugyo ebolaviruses) are to be capitalized, are not italicized, and used without articles. A formal proposal to accept this species into virus taxonomy was submitted in 2010 and was accepted by the ICTV in 2011.

Species inclusion criteria 
A virus of the genus Ebolavirus is a member of the species Bundibugyo ebolavirus if:
 it is endemic in Uganda
 it has a genome with three gene overlaps (VP35/VP40, GP/VP30, VP24/L)
 it has a genomic sequence different from Ebola virus by ≥30%, but different from that of Bundibugyo virus by <30%

A virus of the species Bundibugyo ebolavirus is a Bundibugyo virus if it has the properties of Bundibugyo ebolaviruses and if its genome diverges from that of the prototype Bundibugyo ebolavirus, Bundibugyo virus variant #811250 (BDBV/#811250), by ≤10% at the nucleotide level.

Previous designations 
Bundibugyo virus was first introduced as Bundibugyo ebolavirus in 2008, albeit without differentiating this name from the suggested species Bundibugyo ebolavirus. Another name introduced at the same time was Uganda ebolavirus. Later publications also referred to the virus as a novel "strain" of Ebola virus or as Bundibugyo Ebola virus. The abbreviations BEBOV (for Bundibugyo ebolavirus) and UEBOV (for Uganda ebolavirus) were briefly used before BDBV was established as the abbreviation for Bundibugyo virus.

Disease 
BDBV is one of four ebolaviruses that causes Ebola virus disease (EVD) in humans (in the literature also often referred to as Ebola hemorrhagic fever, EHF). EVD due to BDBV infection cannot be differentiated from EVD caused by other ebolaviruses by clinical observation alone, which is why the clinical presentation and pathology of infections by all ebolaviruses is presented together on a separate page (see Ebola virus disease). BDBV made its first appearance on August 1 of 2007, when a viral hemorrhagic fever outbreak began in the Bundibugyo and Kikyo townships of Bundibugyo District in western Uganda. Blood samples from suspect cases were sent to the US Centers for Disease Control and Prevention, where the presence of an ebolavirus was confirmed on November 29, 2007. In depth analysis revealed that the present ebolavirus was a relative, but not identical, to the other four ebolaviruses known at the time. The outbreak was declared over on February 20, 2008.

A second outbreak was reported by the WHO August 17, 2012 suspected to have infected 15 and killed 10 including 3 health care workers in Isiro, Pawa and Dungu, Province Orientale, DRC. 2 of the cases have been confirmed to be BDBV. It is reported that bushmeat was the source.  By Sept 3, the WHO reported that the number of cases had risen to 28, with 8 confirmed, 6 probable and 14 suspected, including 14 deaths, and as of 12 September, it had spread to Viadana and  a total of "41 cases (9 laboratory confirmed, and 32 probable) have been reported from Haut-Uélé district in Province Orientale. Of these cases, 18 have been fatal. (5 confirmed and 13 probable). 18 healthcare workers are included among the probable cases. 28 suspected cases have also been reported and are being investigated.". In a press release, the Democratic Republic of Congo announced a final tally of 77 cases (36 confirmed, 17 probable and 24 suspect) with 36 deaths.

Ecology 
The ecology of BDBV is currently unclear and no reservoir host has yet been identified. Therefore, it remains unclear how BDBV was introduced into the human population. Bats are suspected to harbor the virus because infectious Marburg virus (MARV) and Ravn virus (RAVV), two distantly related filoviruses, have been isolated from bats, and because traces (but no infectious particles) of the more closely related Ebola virus (EBOV) were found in bats as well.

Molecular Biology 
BDBV is basically uncharacterized on a molecular level. However, its genomic sequence, and with it the genomic organization and the conservation of individual open reading frames, is similar to that of the other four known ebolaviruses (58-61% nucleotide similarity). It is therefore currently assumed that the knowledge obtained for EBOV can be extrapolated to BDBV and that all BDBV proteins are analogs of those of EBOV.

Patent 
A United States patent with multinational collaborative recognition was applied for on 10/26/2009, and published 10/4/2012, for the rights to BDBV.  The patent is listed under six different numbers, including one assigned a US appellation, as well as one Canadian (CA), two European Patent Office (EP), and two World Intellectual Property Organization (WO) designations.
 US 20120251502 A1
 CA 2741523 A1
 EP 2350270 A2
 EP 2350270 A4
 WO 2010048615 A2
 WO 2010048615 A3

It is openly noted in the Deposit Statement of the patent application (Section [0002]) that the virus sample was deposited to the CDC in Atlanta, GA, on November 26, 2007, not to an International Depository Authority (IDA), which was the accepted method as established under the Budapest Treaty on the International Recognition of the Deposit of Microorganisms for Purposes of Patent Procedure.  According to the same section, the “deposited organism” was also admittedly, “not acceptable by American Type Culture Collection.”  This sample was painstakingly researched, and led to the patent application.

Section [0037] of the patent explains its purpose as having “utility in design of diagnostic assays to monitor Ebola HF [Hemorrhagic Fever] disease in humans and animals, and develop effective antivirals and vaccines.”  Further, to avoid limiting the extent and reach of the patent, Section [0036] states that:

It is to be understood that the present invention is not limited to particular embodiments described, as such may, of :course, vary.  It is also to be understood that the terminology used herein :is for the purpose of describing particular :embodiments only, and is not intended to be limiting.

The patent was published before the US Supreme Court ruled that natural material could not be patented as being an invention (as dictated in the 2013 trial: “Association for Molecular Pathology, et al., v. Myriad Genetics, Inc., et al.;” argued 04/15/2013 and decided 06/13/2013), but synthetic copies of natural materials could be patented and protected.  If and/or how this ruling has affected the patent for the Bundibugyo strain of Ebola is unclear.

References

External links
 ICTV Files and Discussions - Discussion forum and file distribution for the International Committee on Taxonomy of Viruses 
 

Arthropod-borne viral fevers and viral haemorrhagic fevers
Biological weapons
Ebolaviruses
Virus-related cutaneous conditions